Marine Point is a shopping and leisure complex in New Brighton, Merseyside, England. The development was built at an estimated cost of £65 million. In 2022 Marine point was sold to David Samuel Properties for £44 million.

As of February 2018, the development consisted of:

 Unit 1 – Caffe Cream
 Unit 2 – Bella Italia 
 Unit 3 – Prezzo
 Unit 4 – Burger King
 Unit 5 – Marino Lounge
 Unit 6 – Leisure unit available – 3,200sq ft
 Hotel –  Travelodge – 66 rooms
 Unit 7 – United Kitchen (closed Autumn 2017)
 Unit 8 – PizzaExpress
 Unit 9 – Hungry Horse - The Sea Horse
 Unit 10 – Cinema – The Light – 8 Screen Digital Cinema
 Unit 12 – Starbucks
 Unit 13 – Harry Ramsden's Fish & Chips (closed Winter 2018) 
 Unit 14 – Subway
 Morrisons Superstore
 Unit 18 – Grosvenor Casino (closed Summer 2015)
 Unit 17 – Costa Coffee
 Unit 16 – Iceland
 Unit 15 – Home Bargains
 Lido – Bubbles' World Of Play - Opened January 2013
 Parking - Free 750 space car park

References 

Buildings and structures in the Metropolitan Borough of Wirral
New Brighton, Merseyside
Shopping centres in Merseyside